A Aravinddaraj (born 9 June 1996) is an Indian cricketer. He made his Twenty20 debut for Pondicherry in the 2018–19 Syed Mushtaq Ali Trophy on 21 February 2019. He made his first-class debut on 9 December 2019, for Pondicherry in the 2019–20 Ranji Trophy.

References

External links
 

1996 births
Living people
Indian cricketers
Pondicherry cricketers
Place of birth missing (living people)